"The Dunwich Horror" is a horror novella by American writer H. P. Lovecraft. Written in 1928, it was first published in the April 1929 issue of Weird Tales (pp. 481–508).  It takes place in Dunwich, a fictional town in Massachusetts. It is considered one of the core stories of the Cthulhu Mythos.

Plot
In the desolate, decrepit Massachusetts village of Dunwich, Wilbur Whateley is the hideous son of Lavinia Whateley, a deformed and unstable albino, and an unknown father. Strange events surround Wilbur's birth and precocious development; he matures at an abnormal rate, reaching manhood within a decade. Locals shun him and his family, and animals fear and despise him due to his repellent appearance and an unnatural, inhuman odor emanating from his body. All the while his grandfather, a sorcerer called only Old Whateley, indoctrinates him into certain dark rituals and the study of witchcraft. Various locals grow suspicious after Old Whateley buys more and more cattle, yet the number of his herd never increases and the cattle in his field become mysteriously afflicted with severe open wounds.

Wilbur and Old Whateley have sequestered an unseen entity at their farmhouse; this entity is connected somehow to a being known as Yog-Sothoth, which is Wilbur's father. Year by year, the entity grows to monstrous proportions, requiring the two men to make frequent modifications to the farmhouse. People begin to notice a trend of cattle mysteriously disappearing. Old Whateley eventually dies, and Wilbur's mother Lavinia disappears soon after. The colossal entity eventually occupies the entire interior of the farmhouse.

Wilbur ventures to Miskatonic University in Arkham to procure their copy of the Necronomicon – Miskatonic's library is one of only a handful in the world to stock an original. The Necronomicon has spells that Wilbur can use to summon the Old Ones, but his family's copy is damaged and lacks the page he needs to open the "door". When the librarian, Dr. Henry Armitage, refuses to release the university's copy to him (and, by sending warnings to other libraries, thwarts Wilbur's efforts to consult their copies), Wilbur breaks into the library under the cover of night to steal it. A guard dog, maddened by Wilbur's alien body odor, attacks with unusual ferocity and kills him. When Armitage and two other professors, Warren Rice and Francis Morgan, arrive on the scene, they see Wilbur's semi-human corpse before it melts completely, leaving no evidence.

With Wilbur dead, no one attends to the mysterious presence growing in the Whateley farmhouse. Early one morning, the farmhouse explodes, and the thing, a towering, invisible monster, rampages across Dunwich, leaving huge prints the size of tree trunks. The monster eventually makes forays into inhabited areas. The invisible creature terrorizes Dunwich for several days, killing two families and several policemen, until Armitage, Rice, and Morgan arrive with the knowledge and weapons needed to kill it. The use of a magic powder renders the monster visible just long enough to send one of the crew into shock. It babbles in an alien tongue, then screams for help from its father Yog-Sothoth in English just before the spell destroys it, leaving a massive burned area. In the end, its nature is revealed: it was Wilbur's twin brother, but it "looked more like the father than he [Wilbur] did."

Characters
Old Whateley
Lavinia Whateley's "aged and half-insane father, about whom the most frightful tales of magic had been whispered in his youth". He has a large collection of "rotting ancient books and parts of books" which he uses to "instruct and catechise" his grandson Wilbur. He dies of natural causes on August 2, 1924. Whateley was given no certain first name by Lovecraft, although Fungi from Yuggoth mentions a John Whateley; he is referred to as Noah Whateley in the Call of Cthulhu role-playing game. According to S.T. Joshi, "It is not certain where Lovecraft got the name Whateley," but there is a small town called Whately in northwestern Massachusetts near the Mohawk Trail, which Lovecraft hiked several times, including in the summer of 1928. Robert M. Price's short story "Wilbur Whateley Waiting" emphasizes the obvious pun in the name.
Lavinia Whateley
Born circa 1878, Lavinia Whateley is the spinster daughter of Old Whateley whose mother met an "unexplained death by violence" when Lavinia was 12. She is described as a somewhat deformed, unattractive albino woman...a lone creature given to wandering amidst thunderstorms in the hills and trying to read the great odorous books which her father had inherited through two centuries of Whateleys...She had never been to school, but was filled with disjointed scraps of ancient lore that Old Whateley had taught her...Isolated among strange influences, Lavinia was fond of wild and grandiose day-dreams and singular occupations. Elsewhere, she is called "slatternly [and] crinkly-haired". In 1913, she gave birth to Wilbur Whately by an unknown father, later revealed to be Yog-Sothoth. On Halloween night in 1926, she disappeared under mysterious circumstances, presumably killed or sacrificed by her son.
Wilbur Whateley
Born February 2, 1913 at 5 a.m. to Lavinia Whateley and Yog-Sothoth. Described as a "dark, goatish-looking infant"—neighbors refer to him as "Lavinny's black brat"—he shows extreme precocity: "Within three months of his birth, he had attained a size and muscular power not usually found in infants under a full year of age...At seven months, he began to walk unassisted," and he "commenced to talk...at the age of only eleven months." At three years of age, "he looked like a boy of ten," while at four and a half, he "looked like a lad of fifteen. His lips and cheeks were fuzzy with a coarse dark down, and his voice had begun to break." "Though he shared his mother's and grandfather's chinlessness, his firm and precociously shaped nose united with the expression of his large, dark, almost Latin eyes to give him an air of...well-nigh preternatural intelligence," Lovecraft writes, though at the same time he is "exceedingly ugly...there being something almost goatish or animalistic about his thick lips, large-pored, yellowish skin, coarse crinkly hair, and oddly elongated ears." He dies at the age of fifteen after being mauled by a guard dog while breaking into the Miskatonic library on August 3, 1928.  His death scene allows Lovecraft to provide a detailed description of Wilbur's partly nonhuman anatomy: "The thing that lay half-bent on its side in a foetid pool of greenish-yellow ichor and tarry stickiness was almost nine feet tall, and the dog had torn off all the clothing and some of the skin...It was partly human, beyond a doubt, with very manlike hands and head, and the goatish, chinless face had the stamp of the Whateleys upon it. But the torso and lower parts of the body were teratologically fabulous, so that only generous clothing could ever have enabled it to walk on earth unchallenged or uneradicated. Above the waist it was semi-anthropomorphic; though its chest...had the leathery, reticulated hide of a crocodile or alligator. The back was piebald with yellow and black, and dimly suggested the squamous covering of certain snakes. Below the waist, though, it was the worst; for here all human resemblance left off and sheer phantasy began. The skin was thickly covered with coarse black fur, and from the abdomen a score of long greenish-grey tentacles with red sucking mouths protruded limply. Their arrangement was odd, and seemed to follow the symmetries of some cosmic geometry unknown to earth or the solar system. On each of the hips, deep set in a kind of pinkish, ciliated orbit, was what seemed to be a rudimentary eye; whilst in lieu of a tail there depended a kind of trunk or feeler with purple annular markings, and with many evidences of being an undeveloped mouth or throat. The limbs, save for their black fur, roughly resembled the hind legs of prehistoric earth's giant saurians, and terminated in ridgy-veined pads that were neither hooves nor claws." This death scene bears a marked resemblance to that of Jervase Cradock, a similarly half-human character in Arthur Machen's "The Novel of the Black Seal": "Something pushed out from the body there on the floor, and stretched forth, a slimy, wavering tentacle," Machen writes. Will Murray notes that the goatish, partly reptilian Wilbur Whateley resembles a chimera, a mythological creature referred to in Charles Lamb's epigraph to "The Dunwich Horror". Robert M. Price points out that Wilbur Whateley is in some respects an autobiographical figure for Lovecraft: "Wilbur's being raised by a grandfather instead of a father, his home education from his grandfather's library, his insane mother, his stigma of ugliness (in Lovecraft's case untrue, but a self-image imposed on him by his mother), and his sense of being an outsider all echo Lovecraft himself."
Henry Armitage
The head librarian at Miskatonic University.  As a young man, he graduated from Miskatonic in 1881 and went on to obtain his doctorate from Princeton University and his doctor of letters at Johns Hopkins University.  Lovecraft noted that while writing "The Dunwich Horror", "[I] found myself identifying with one of the characters (an aged scholar who finally combats the menace) toward the end". 

Francis Morgan
Professor of Medicine and Comparative Anatomy (or Archaeology) at Miskatonic University. The story refers to him as "lean" and "youngish". In Fritz Leiber's "To Arkham and the Stars"—written in 1966 and apparently set at about that time—Morgan is described as "the sole living survivor of the brave trio who had slain the Dunwich Horror". According to Leiber, Morgan's "research in mescaline and LSD" produced "clever anti-hallucinogens" that were instrumental in curing Danforth's mental illness.
Warren Rice
Professor of Classical Languages at Miskatonic University. He is called "stocky" and "iron-grey".

Inspiration

Geographical
In a letter to August Derleth, Lovecraft wrote that "The Dunwich Horror" "takes place amongst the wild domed hills of the upper Miskatonic Valley, far northwest of Arkham, and is based on several New England legends — one of which I heard only last month during my sojourn in Wilbraham," a town east of Springfield, Massachusetts. One such legend is the notion that whippoorwills can capture the departing soul.

In another letter, Lovecraft wrote that Dunwich is "a vague echo of the decadent Massachusetts countryside around Springfield, Massachusetts — say Wilbraham, Monson and Hampden." Robert M. Price notes that "much of the physical description of the Dunwich countryside is a faithful sketch of Wilbraham," citing a passage from a letter from Lovecraft to Zealia Bishop that "sounds like a passage from 'The Dunwich Horror' itself":

The physical model for Dunwich's Sentinel Hill is thought to be Wilbraham Mountain near Wilbraham.

Some researchers have pointed out the story's apparent connections to another Massachusetts region: the area around Athol and points south, in the north-central part of the state (which is where Lovecraft indicates that Dunwich is located). It has been suggested that the name Dunwich was inspired by the town of Greenwich, which was deliberately flooded to create the Quabbin Reservoir, although Greenwich and the nearby towns of Dana, Enfield and Prescott actually were not submerged until 1938.  Donald R. Burleson points out that several names included in the story—including Bishop, Frye, Sawyer, Rice and Morgan—are either prominent Athol names or have a connection to the town's history, however Rice is also the name of a prominent Wilbraham family as well. 

Athol's Sentinel Elm Farm seems to be the source for the name Sentinel Hill. The Bear's Den mentioned in the story resembles an actual cave of the same name visited by Lovecraft in North New Salem, southwest of Athol. (New Salem, like Dunwich, was founded by settlers from Salem—though in 1737, not 1692.)

The book Myths and Legends of Our Own Land (1896), by Charles M. Skinner, mentions a "Devil's Hop Yard" near Haddam, Connecticut as a gathering place for witches. The book, which Lovecraft seems to have read, also describes noises emanating from the earth near Moodus, Connecticut, which are similar to the Dunwich sounds decried by Rev. Abijah Hoadley.

Literary
Lovecraft's main literary sources for "The Dunwich Horror" are the stories of Welsh horror writer Arthur Machen, particularly "The Great God Pan" (mentioned in the text of "The Dunwich Horror") and "The Novel of the Black Seal". Both Machen stories concern individuals whose death throes reveal them to be only half-human in their parentage. According to Robert M. Price, "'The Dunwich Horror' is in every sense an homage to Machen and even a pastiche. There is little in Lovecraft's story that does not come directly out of Machen's fiction." As one example similarity, both Wilbur and Helen are the child of an invisible god and a human female, and both of them after dying quickly turned into black liquid.

Another source that has been suggested is "The Thing in the Woods", by Margery Williams, which is also about two brothers living in the woods, neither of them quite human and one of them less human than the other.

The name Dunwich itself may come from Machen's The Terror, where the name refers to an English town where the titular entity is seen hovering as "a black cloud with sparks of fire in it". Lovecraft also takes Wilbur Whateley's occult terms "Aklo" and "Voorish" from Machen's "The White People".

Lovecraft also seems to have found inspiration in Anthony M. Rud's story "Ooze" (published in Weird Tales, March 1923), which also involved a monster being secretly kept and fed in a house that it subsequently bursts out of and destroys.

The tracks of Wilbur's brother recall those seen in Algernon Blackwood's "The Wendigo", one of Lovecraft's favorite horror stories. Ambrose Bierce's story "The Damned Thing" also involves a monster invisible to human eyes.

Reception 
Lovecraft took pride in "The Dunwich Horror", calling it "so fiendish that [Weird Tales editor] Farnsworth Wright may not dare to print it." Wright, however, snapped it up, sending Lovecraft a check for $240, the largest single payment for his fiction he had received up to that point.

Kingsley Amis praised "The Dunwich Horror" in New Maps of Hell, listing it as one of Lovecraft's tales that "achieve a memorable nastiness".  Lovecraft biographer Lin Carter calls the story "an excellent tale...A mood of tension and gathering horror permeates the story, which culminates in a shattering climax". In his list of "The 13 Most Terrifying Horror Stories", T.E.D. Klein placed "The Dunwich Horror" at number four. Robert M. Price declares that "among the tales of H. P. Lovecraft, 'The Dunwich Horror' remains my favorite." S.T. Joshi, on the other hand, regarded "Dunwich" as "simply an aesthetic mistake on Lovecraft's part", citing its "stock good-versus-evil scenario". However, he has also noted that it is "richly atmospheric."

Cthulhu Mythos

Although Lovecraft first mentioned Yog-Sothoth in the novel The Case of Charles Dexter Ward, it was in "The Dunwich Horror" that he introduced the entity as one of his extra-dimensional Outer Gods. It is also the tale in which the Necronomicon makes the most significant appearance, and the longest direct quote from it appears in the text. Many of the other standards of the Cthulhu Mythos, such as Miskatonic University, Arkham, and Dunwich, also form integral parts of the tale.

A librarian named Armitage appears in Don Webb's short story "To Mars and Providence", an alternate history where a juvenile Lovecraft is influenced by the events of H.G. Wells's The War of the Worlds.

The biannual NecronomiCon Providence has a Dr. Henry Armitage Memorial Scholarship Symposium, and its papers are printed by Hippocampus Press.

Adaptations

Film and television
A film version, The Dunwich Horror, was released in 1970. It starred Dean Stockwell as Wilbur Whateley, Ed Begley as Henry Armitage and Sandra Dee. Les Baxter composed the soundtrack. It was the final film for Begley, who died in April of that year.
 Another film version of the tale starring Jeffrey Combs as Wilbur Whately and directed by Leigh Scott was first broadcast in October 2009 on SyFy. Dean Stockwell also stars in this version, this time as Dr. Henry Armitage. The working title was The Darkest Evil.
"The Dunwich Horror", along with "The Picture in the House" and "The Festival", were adapted into short claymation films, and released by Toei Animation as a DVD compilation called  in 2007.
 Director Richard Griffin made a modern update of "The Dunwich Horror" called Beyond the Dunwich Horror.
 In a Q&A session upon the release of Color Out of Space in 2020, director Richard Stanley revealed he was writing an adaptation that would serve as the second entry in a Lovecraft trilogy of film adaptations. However, it is unknown whether this adaptation will proceed due to film company SpectreVision cutting ties with Stanley after allegations of domestic violence. On August 16, 2022, Stanley stated that he intends to still go through with making his modern remake of The Dunwich Horror, having prepared a script for it, on the Here's the Thing with Alec Baldwin podcast. He also asked Baldwin to read the script for the role of Dr. Armitage which Baldwin expressed interest in.

Graphic novel and comics
Comics artist Alberto Breccia adapted the story in 1974. It was published in Heavy Metal October 1979 issue.
Comics artist John Coulthart started to adapt the story in 1989. The unfinished story was published in 1999.
 In 2011, IDW Publishing began publishing a four-issue limited adaptation of "The Dunwich Horror" by Bram Stoker Award-winning author Joe R. Lansdale and artist Peter Bergting.
 In 2016, cartoonist and illustrator Ben Granoff published a graphic novel adaptation.

Radio drama and stage play
 The radio drama Suspense adapted "The Dunwich Horror".  It stars Academy Award winner Ronald Colman as Henry Armitage, and aired originally on November 1, 1945.
 The H.P. Lovecraft Historical Society adapted the story in 2008 as an audio drama titled Dark Adventure Radio Theatre: The Dunwich Horror, similar to their earlier adaptation of At the Mountains of Madness.
 The story was adapted into an "audio horror movie" in 2010 by Colin Edwards and the sound company Savalas. The recording is essentially an audio drama recorded in 5.1 Surround Sound to create a movie without pictures. It premiered at the Filmhouse cinema in Edinburgh on 23 June 2010 as part of the 64th Edinburgh International Film Festival. Director/writer Colin Edwards was in attendance along with cast members Greg Hemphill, Innes Smith and Vivien Taylor and sound designer Kahl Henderson.
 In 2011, Julie Hoverson, through her audio production company 19 Nocturne Boulevard, released an adaptation of "The Dunwich Horror" in a four-part miniseries.
 In 2013, The Company (a Yorkshire amateur dramatics society) produced a stage play adaptation of "The Dunwich Horror" at the Drama Studio at the University of Sheffield.

Short story collection
The Dunwich Horror and Others is the title of a collection of H. P. Lovecraft short stories published by Arkham House, containing what August Derleth considered to be the best of Lovecraft's shorter fiction. Originally published in 1963, the 6th printing in 1985 included extensive corrections by S. T. Joshi in order to produce the definitive edition of Lovecraft's works. The collection has an introduction by Robert Bloch, titled "Heritage of Horror", reprinted from the 1982 Ballantine collection, Blood Curdling Tales of Supernatural Horror: The Best of H.P. Lovecraft.

The stories included in The Dunwich Horror and Others are "In the Vault", "Pickman's Model", "The Rats in the Walls", "The Outsider", "The Colour Out of Space", "The Music of Erich Zann", "The Haunter of the Dark", "The Picture in the House", "The Call of Cthulhu", "The Dunwich Horror", "Cool Air", "The Whisperer in Darkness", "The Terrible Old Man", "The Thing on the Doorstep", "The Shadow Over Innsmouth", and "The Shadow Out of Time".

Influence
 The Leviathan arc of the Gothic soap opera Dark Shadows was heavily influenced by "The Dunwich Horror", as well as other Lovecraft works. The character of Jebez "Jeb" Hawkes is the essence of the Leviathan leader who matures at a rapid rate and transforms into an invisible murderous creature.
 Neil Gaiman's short story "I, Cthulhu" features a human slave/biographer referred to only as Whateley.
Stoner/doom metal band Electric Wizard released a song on their 2007 album, Witchcult Today, entitled "Dunwich", based around the short story. "We Hate You", from their 2000 album, Dopethrone, contains sound clips from the film.
 Rock band The Darkest of the Hillside Thickets, known for their Lovecraftian themes,  released a song called "Going Down to Dunwich" which follows the plot of the story and contains audio clips from the 1970 film version.
 Lucio Fulci's 1980 movie City of the Living Dead is set in a town named Dunwich.
 On his third album, Medallion Animal Carpet, Bob Drake and a collaborator retell the story of "The Dunwich Horror" under the title "Dunwich Confidential".
 The 2008 video game Fallout 3 features a location named The Dunwich Building, formerly home to a company called Dunwich Borers LLC, with a mini-story of a man searching for his father, who is in possession of an "old, bloodstained book made of weird leather". The man is found in front of an obelisk under the building, driven insane and turned into a feral ghoul. The building itself is full of various supernatural phenomena such as flashbacks to the past. A later downloadable add-on, Point Lookout, features a quest involving a book with a similar purpose as the Necronomicon and an equally strange name, the Krivbeknih, which can be destroyed in the basement of the Dunwich Building.
 The 2015 video game Fallout 4, sequel to Fallout 3 and set in Massachusetts, features a location with similar paranormal activity called Dunwich Borers, which was a quarry owned by Dunwich Borers LLC.
 "Boojum", a short story by Elizabeth Bear and Sarah Monette, features a living, sentient space ship (a Boojum) named "Lavinia Whateley" by her pirate crew.
 Chiaki Konaka, scriptwriter of the 1995 cyberpunk series Armitage III, reported being influenced by this story when writing the series. Among other signs of influence are the character named Armitage, another character named Lavinia Whateley, and a location variously spelled as Dunwich or "Danich" Hill. 
 Doom metal band Iron Man's 2013 album South of the Earth contains the song "Half Face/Thy Brother's Keeper (Dunwich Pt. 2"), which is based on the story.
 Japanese progressive metal band Ningen Isu recorded a song "Dunwich no Kai" (The Dunwich Horror) in their 1998 album Taihai Geijutsu-ten.
 Harry Turtledove's book Nine Drowned Churches is set in Dunwich, England, which is similar to the town in "The Dunwich Horror", including the family names, and the protagonist is aware of the events of this story.
 The board game Arkham Horror has an expansion known as The Dunwich Horror, in which both the grandfather named Wizard Whately and the Dunwich Horror appear.
 In the mobile game Fate/Grand Order, a young girl with albinism named Lavinia Whateley appears in the Salem chapter, which features various motifs derived from Lovecraftian works which are played in concert with an alternative telling of the Salem witch trials. She is a close friend of another girl named Abigail Williams.

References

Sources
 Definitive version.

External links

 Full-text at The H. P. Lovecraft Archive
 
  (episode 154, 1 November 1945, radio drama)
 
 

1928 short stories
Cthulhu Mythos short stories
Horror short stories
Fantasy short stories
Massachusetts in fiction
Short stories adapted into films
Short stories by H. P. Lovecraft
Witchcraft in written fiction
Works originally published in Weird Tales
Works by Joe R. Lansdale